Everwood (known as Our New Life in Everwood in the United Kingdom) is an American drama television series created by Greg Berlanti. Berlanti, Mickey Liddell, Rina Mimoun, Andrew A. Ackerman and Michael Green served as executive producers. The series aired on The WB from September 16, 2002, to June 5, 2006, with a total of 89 episodes spanning four seasons. It was co-produced by Berlanti-Liddell Productions, in association with Warner Bros. Television. 

The series begins with Dr. Andy Brown, played by Treat Williams, who moves his family to the fictional small town of Everwood, Colorado after the death of his wife. The series also stars Gregory Smith, Vivien Cardone, Emily VanCamp, Chris Pratt, Debra Mooney, Stephanie Niznik, John Beasley and Tom Amandes. The pilot was filmed in Calgary and Canmore, Alberta, as well as Denver, Colorado; after that, series filming took place in Ogden, South Salt Lake, Draper, and Park City, Utah.

The series concluded on June 5, 2006. It was canceled by The WB on May 17, 2006, after four seasons, following the merger with UPN to form The CW.

Plot

Season 1
The series begins with the arrival of Dr. Andrew "Andy" Brown (Treat Williams), a widower who leaves his successful job as a top Manhattan neurosurgeon to live in a small Colorado town, bringing his 9-year-old daughter Delia (Vivien Cardone) and 15-year-old son Ephram (Gregory Smith) with him. He chooses the town of Everwood because his late wife had told him of her emotional attachment to the town. Many of the story lines revolve around settling into a new town, dealing with the death of the mother and wife of the family, and the growing relationship between Andy and his son, who did not interact much in New York, due to the demands of Andy's job. Andy at first finds some conflict with Dr. Harold Abbott (Tom Amandes), with whom his professional opinions differ. However, Harold's cranky demeanor and Andy's passive, cheerful attitude prove to mesh well, and the two begin a friendly rivalry. Ephram continually struggles with his emerging adolescence, his studies as a classical pianist, and his crush on Amy (Emily VanCamp), Harold's daughter.

The first season revolves around the main storyline involving Colin Hart (Mike Erwin), Amy's boyfriend and older brother Bright's (Chris Pratt) best friend. Amy sees the arrival of Andy as an opportunity: Colin has been in a coma since July 4 of the previous summer, after Bright and he were in a car accident. Amy befriends Ephram in an effort to convince Andy to revive his neurosurgeon skills to save Colin. Andy reluctantly agrees. Amy is elated, but Bright is sullen and distant about the situation. Later, he tearfully confesses to his father that—contrary to what he had claimed all summer—he does in fact remember the accident: He was the one driving Colin's father's truck and the two boys were drunk at the time. His anguish is relieved when Andy is successful, and soon Colin is awake.

In the meantime, Ephram's maternal grandparents come to visit their new home in the fall and Ephram decides he wants to move back to New York City to live with them. Ephram's grandfather—also a surgeon—berates Andy into letting Ephram go. Delia and her grandmother befriend Edna Harper (Debra Mooney), a semi-retired army nurse and Harold's estranged mother. They decide to throw her a surprise birthday party at the Browns' home. During the party, in front of all the guests, Ephram and Andy have a loud fight about his moving to New York City. The two stalk to different parts of the house with no decision resolved. Andy and his father-in-law also begin to fight about the situation but are interrupted because Bright has collapsed. He needs his appendix removed, but the snow has prevented travel to the nearest hospital, so they do emergency surgery on him in Andy's office. Andy sees how concerned and loving Harold is toward his son and resolves to try and patch things up with Ephram. He confesses that he will be "half a man" if Ephram leaves, and as a result Ephram decides to stay.

Andy meets his next-door neighbor Nina Feeney (Stephanie Niznik) after a loud fight with Ephram in the front yard. She is friendly but outspoken and honest. Nina eventually explains that she is serving as a surrogate mother for a woman who was unable to conceive. A scandal erupts when Nina has the baby and it is revealed that the mother is well over fifty, but Andy supports Nina's decision.

All is not well for Colin. He returns home and re-enrolls in school, but he has lost most of his memory, including his memory of Amy. Under pressure to step back into his old life, Colin befriends Ephram since the latter is the only person who does not have a preconceived notion of him. Amy, meanwhile, struggles with emerging feelings for Ephram as he has an unsuccessful relationship with Colin's sister, Laynie. His lingering attachment to Amy flares up at inopportune moments, causing Laynie to break it off.

Soon Colin begins lashing out violently and acting out emotionally and loses his friendship with Ephram. Ephram tries to let his friends know that Colin is not acting normally, but Amy believes he is just jealous of her relationship with Colin and that Colin is "under a lot of stress". Bright, frustrated at Colin's friendship with Ephram in the first place, refuses to listen as well, until Colin accosts Ephram outside the local diner, proceeding to uncharacteristically punch Bright in the face when he objects to Colin's roughness. Andy believes Ephram (also following a grievous, self-inflicted hand injury during a homecoming ceremony) and brings the subject up with Colin's parents. They are unwilling to believe that Colin is anything but fully recovered and fire Andy from Colin's care. Physical symptoms begin to manifest as well, and eventually Colin collapses. It is learned there are complications from the first surgery. Colin's parents ask Andrew to operate again, but then he experiences complications during the surgery.

Season 2
The beginning of Season 2 reveals Colin's fate. The entire town blames Andy for "killing" Colin. They stop going to his practice and shun his children. Andy stands by his decision and eventually admits to Ephram that he could have saved Colin's life, but he would have been mentally and physically disabled and, at Colin's insistence, promised that he would not let him live that way.

Amy struggles with Colin's death and falls into a deep depression, eventually going on medication and meeting Tommy Callahan, a drug-dealing loner who becomes more than a friend. She considers sleeping with Tommy but backs out of it every time he brings it up. Harold buys her a new car to try and cheer her up, but Amy continues to act out and fail in school. Rose (Merrilyn Gann), Harold's wife and the town mayor, tells her husband that he is babying her and she is unwelcome in her house until she follows the rules, which forces Amy to move in with Edna. Amy's downward spiral continues until Tommy takes her to a wild party. He gives her a bottle of water laced with GHB. Already intoxicated, Amy drinks it, then has a hallucination of Colin, who tells her to let him go and to get on with her life. The vision shocks her back to reality, and she realizes that Tommy has drunk most of the water himself and subsequently overdosed. Amy does the only thing she can think of and calls her father for help. Tommy recovers, but Amy is scared straight. She dumps him, moves back in with her parents, and begins to improve her behavior and mood.

Ephram, meanwhile, has found love with Madison, a 20-year-old college student whom Andy has hired to babysit Delia. She is a girl whom Ephram initially despises for her condescending attitude toward him. After a few false starts, he eventually loses his virginity to her.

The second season has several other important plot developments. Andy finds a new love interest in Linda Abbott, Harold's globe-trotting sister, also a doctor but practicing in Africa. A scandal at Harold and Linda's office occurs when it is revealed to the populace of Everwood that Linda had contracted HIV from a victim of an African civil war incident. As a result, Harold loses his liability insurance coverage, and Linda quits her holistic health practice and leaves town, also ending her romance with Andy. Harold tries to open a new bagel shop but meets with failure. Andy then invites him as a partner, since Andy's insurance would cover Harold's practice. Harold reluctantly agrees.

Nina goes through a divorce with her recently outed husband Carl and has to go to court over custody of her son Sam, a case which she eventually wins with Andy's support.

A lonely Bright grows more tolerant of Ephram, and the two eventually become good friends.

Ephram continues his on-and-off relationship with Madison. In an effort to prove how mature he is, he sneaks into bars to see her band and produces many awkward moments by showing up when she is out with her college friends. Finally she decides that the timing of their relationship is off and breaks up with Ephram. She tries to continue working with the Browns, but Delia fires her, saying that she likes Madison but that Madison's presence makes Ephram sad. She later confesses to Andy that she is pregnant with Ephram's child. Andy tells her he will pay for all her expenses if she agrees to keep the pregnancy from Ephram. He believes that Ephram was forced to grow up very quickly by the death of his mother and that—if he learns of the pregnancy—his sense of decency will compel him to stay with Madison, something for which Andy believes he is not ready.

Amy asks Ephram to stay in Everwood, so that they can figure out if a romantic relationship would work between them. However, he is accepted to a summer program at the Juilliard School of Music. He is torn between going to New York and staying with Amy. When he leaves to study music at Juilliard, Amy accompanies him for ten days in Manhattan and, after she returns to Everwood, they continue their relationship long-distance.

Season 3
The third season opens with Andy receiving a letter from Madison tell him that she is in Denver, and is not going to tell him her decision regarding the pregnancy and she wants no further contract. Andy contemplates telling Ephram, but Harold convinces him not to do so, for the sake of Ephram and Amy.

Ephram returns from his summer classes at Juilliard with the disappointing news that he did not receive high marks and begins to intensify his piano studies, which places a strain on his relationship with Amy. The two, now in their senior year of high school, befriend an extremely shy girl, named Hannah (Sarah Drew), who is staying with Nina. Hannah is a junior and tells Amy that her parents are travelling in Hong Kong, but later reveals that her father, with whom she was extremely close, suffers from late-stage Huntington's Disease and she was in fact sent to Everwood so she wouldn't have to watch his suffering. With the support of Amy, Ephram, Harold, and Bright, Hannah decides to get tested and discovers that she didn't inherit the Huntington's gene from her father. 

After much discussion with Hannah, Amy decides to sleep with Ephram and they sneak away to the Abbotts' lake cabin, but Amy gets cold feet and backs out. Ephram is understanding and in the morning she has a change of heart and loses her virginity to Ephram. Around Christmas, Bright tells Ephram where Madison's band is playing and he goes to see her and lies to Amy about it. Ephram misses seeing Madison, but feeling guilty confesses where he went to Amy. Amy is extremely upset telling Ephram that he is devoting all his time to the piano, while she has had to give up her hobbies and school activities to make time for their relationship and resents this. Ephram agrees to set aside more time for them and they make up. 

Bright gets a job at the County Clerk's office with his mother Rose. His promiscuity catches up to him when one young intern accuses him of sexual harassment. Bright maintains that she misunderstood his actions, does not admit guilt and is cleared by an investigation. Rose, embarrassed and hurt, realizes that Bright has long treated women badly, and fires him anyway to teach him a lesson. Bright resolves to do better. 

The third season also sees the arrival of a new, younger doctor named Jake Hartman, whom neither Harold nor Andy like very much, due to his over-zealous attitude. He takes up residence in Harold's former office. Nina, despite her feelings for Andy, believes that she has a future with Jake and begins dating him. 

Andy treats a patient, John Hayes, who has serious incapacitation caused by a stroke. Andy finds himself drawn to John's wife Amanda, which they at first resist but eventually succumb to temptation. Andy's guilt leads to an ulcer. Andy gets John admitted into a cutting-edge treatment program out of town and they resume the affair. John's recovery is miraculous and Amanda returns to her husband. 

Ephram is granted an interview with The Juilliard School in New York City, where he runs into Madison. Andy, who accompanied Ephram, tries to patch things up with Madison and encourages her to tell Ephram about the pregnancy. She invites Ephram for coffee and tells him about the pregnancy and that the baby has been adopted by a couple in Marin, California. She conceals Andy's role in her keeping it secret and leaving, but when Andy learns what Madison has said, he confesses to Ephram. Ephram is livid and bails on his audition to punish Andy for prioritizing his piano playing over his relationship with Madison. Back in Everwood, Ephram tells Amy, who reluctantly agrees to help Ephram locate the baby and the adoptive parents, but the two soon argue about it and break up. 

Rose is diagnosed with a cancerous tumor on her spine and must undergo chemotherapy, which proves to be initially unsuccessful. With some reluctance, Andy agrees to do the surgery to remove the tumor. Harold is incensed until the operation appears to be a success, and Rose slowly recovers.

Ephram, still mad at his father, skips graduation and sells his piano to buy a ticket to London and go backpacking around Europe. Amy graduates from high school and gets into Princeton University.

Jake agrees to give up his LA lifestyle, and settle down with Nina. They start a restaurant together, in the diner where Nina used to waitress. 

Hannah gets a boyfriend for the first time, but breaks up with him because she is still attracted to Bright, who decides to commit to a romantic relationship with her. Amy decides to defer her first semester at Princeton, so that she can help take care of her mother while she convalesces. With Ephram in Europe and Nina living with Jake, Andy considers accepting a job offer in Chicago and moving on, but Harold and others persuade him to stay in Everwood. He tells Nina that he still loves her.

Season 4
The fourth season opens with Edna and her husband Irv planning a vow-renewal ceremony. Rose is recovering well, and Jake has moved in with Nina. Bright starts his second year at Everwood Community College and has moved into an apartment. A medical student, Reid, has caught Amy's eye, and Amy convinces Bright to let Reid be his roommate. At the request of Delia, who desperately misses him, Ephram returns from Europe in time to attend the end of Irv and Edna's ceremony.

When Ephram returns Andy tells him that he is welcome at home, but he will not pay Ephram's living expenses anywhere else. Their relationship continues to be strained. Andy doesn't want to damage Ephram and Delia's relationship, so he tells Ephram that he will pay him $50 for every dinner they eat together as a family. The plan seems to work, and sometimes Ephram doesn't collect the money at all. Ephram starts his first semester at Everwood Community College with Bright, who asks him to be a third roommate. Reid and Amy date casually. Ephram begins giving piano lessons to a high-school freshman, Kyle Hunter. Although talented, Kyle is sullen and difficult. By helping out Kyle, Ephram gains a new appreciation for what he put his own father through. Also, Andy has a patient who is estranged from his daughter because he kept a secret from her for her whole life. Andy asks Ephram to talk to the daughter about forgiveness, and in the process, Ephram begins to let go of some of the resentment he felt towards Andy and their relationship continues to improve.

On a father/son camping trip with the Abbotts, Ephram reveals that he came back to Everwood because he is still in love with Amy, and Bright reveals that he might break up with Hannah because she doesn't believe in premarital sex. Back in town Ephram asks Reid not to date Amy at all and he backs off. Amy and Ephram repair their friendship. Studying together late one night, they wind up sleeping together. Afterward Ephram, wanting to repair their romantic relationship as well, gives Amy a Christmas present and reveals that he wrote her postcards while in Europe but never sent them to her. She asks to take them home and read them but later explains that she does not want to become romantically involved with Ephram again because she is trying to figure out her own identity.

Harold and Rose struggle to get past her illness. Despite her recovery she loses her re-bid for mayor of Everwood and feels lost and useless. After a vacation on an African safari, Rose tells Harold that she wants to adopt a child.

Nina and Jake's restaurant is doing well. Jake begins acting erratic and distant. When one of his visiting Los Angeles buddies has a serious biking accident, Jake is lost and stressed out. It is revealed that he is a recovering narcotics addict and he has "fallen off the wagon". When he finally tells Nina the truth, she kicks him out of the house and cries in Andy's arms.

Meanwhile, Irv has written a fictional book loosely based on his experiences in Everwood. The book, entitled A Mountain Town, goes on to be a thundering success.

Although they seem quite mismatched, Bright and Hannah continue to date. Her father finally passes away and Hannah's mother lets her choose to move home or stay in Everwood. Hannah decides to stay. Bright is elated, but he is also frustrated at Hannah's low self-esteem and forces her to see that she is beautiful by locking her in the bathroom and refusing to let her out until she looks at herself in the mirror. Hannah takes it one step further and invites Bright into the shower with her.

Ephram learns that his old piano teacher, Will Cleveland, has died and attends his wake. Instead of a sad and somber event, it is a celebration of his life, and Ephram is introduced to Will's family as his star pupil. They coax him to play a piece, and it rekindles his love of the instrument. He re-buys a piano, and he helps Kyle prepare for a Juilliard audition. Kyle is still moody, and Ephram often returns to the Brown home to talk to Andy about his struggles and practice his own playing. When he convinces Kyle to meet his absentee father and Kyle is stood up, Ephram confesses to Andy that he thinks about his own child all the time and was using his experience with Kyle to work through his feelings of guilt and irresponsibility. Ephram also tries to help develop Kyle's social skills, since he is always alone and awkward around his classmates. When Reid suggests Kyle might be gay, Ephram says he's too young, attempting to shield him from adversity. Kyle initially denies it as well but eventually decides to come out. With their difficulties behind them, Ephram coaches Kyle successfully into Juilliard. After meeting a concert pianist, Ephram decides to transfer to Amy's college and major in music education. In addition Ephram leaves Madison a voicemail, apologizing for his explosive reaction to their situation.

Bright breaks his hand trying to karate chop a piece of wood and wears a sling for several weeks. Hannah babies him incessantly, and they have a minor spat. Hannah obsesses over their relationship, and Bright runs into an old acquaintance, Ada (Kelly Carlson), an attractive blonde who once sold Bright and Ephram fake IDs. After a few beers together, he has a moment of weakness in judgment and lust and winds up sleeping with Ada. Ephram finds out, but Bright, although regretful, decides he isn't going to tell Hannah. Ephram disagrees, and they stop speaking. Amy wheedles the truth out of Ephram and declares that, if Bright doesn't tell Hannah, she will. Under pressure Bright admits the truth, and Hannah breaks up with him. She tells him she doesn't want him in her life at all, even as just a friend.

Reid begins to fail out of medical school and, as a last-ditch effort, cheats on a test. He is caught and expelled but pretends that everything is fine. Ephram finds Reid one morning on the bathroom floor unconscious after having taken an entire bottle of sleeping pills. Ephram feels immense guilt for not realizing that Reid was depressed. Upon recovery Reid again tries to pretend that everything is just fine and asks Amy out on a date. It is predictably a disaster, and Amy tells Reid that she learned from Colin's death that he has to deal with the things that made him try to commit suicide in the first place. Reid decides to move back home with his mother until he is fully recovered.

Harold and Rose's adoption is in the final stages when it is revealed that Harold lied about Rose's cancer on the admission forms. They lose their opportunity and are heartbroken. Rose develops a bruise on her back and convinces herself that her cancer is active. At the same time, Bright drinks excessively at his 21st birthday party—still hurt by his breakup with Hannah—and stands on a chair at a bar. With his arm in a sling, he loses his balance and falls through a plate glass window. He is rushed to the hospital with a head injury. At the hospital, Rose shares her fears, and Harold tells her that she is fine—the doctor called right before Bright's accident. Subsequently, both Bright and Rose make successful recoveries. A schizophrenic patient of Harold's is overwhelmed with her new baby and the sudden death of her husband. She panics and leaves the baby girl on the Abbotts' doorstep. After a half-hearted search for her, Harold and Rose apply for custody of the baby.

After returning from his book tour, Irv and Edna decide to buy an RV and travel the country. Just after purchasing it, Irv collapses from a second heart attack and dies. Edna maintains her usual, tough persona until Harold confronts her on her erratic behavior. She confesses that she is overwhelmed with grief. Harold and Rose fix up a guest bedroom in their house and invite Edna to live with them, thus ending a years-long battle between mother and son.

Nina agrees to forgive Jake and to take him back, and he begins a variety of recovery programs but is unsurprised when none of them work since they didn't in the past. He decides to start a recovery group in Everwood and then begins to design a program on his own. His old friends in Los Angeles are receptive to the idea, but they want him to move back. Jake asks Nina to come with him, and she sells her house and agrees. Andy—faced with the loss of Nina—impulsively buys her an engagement ring and shows it to Ephram, saying he simply needed to act on his feelings, even if he had no intention of asking her. At Irv's funeral Ephram tells Nina about the ring, who tells Hannah, who convinces Nina to sneak in and look at it. Hannah ends up with the ring in her room, and Jake finds it while packing. He confronts Andy and Nina, and the latter insists that it means nothing. They make it to the airport when Jake realizes that he doesn't want to be with someone who is so unsure and boards the plane alone. Nina shows up back at the Browns—a sleeping Sam in tow—as her house has already been sold. Andy takes a cathartic trip to New York to say goodbye to his late wife Julia one last time before flying back to Everwood to propose to Nina on the very spot they met. She happily agrees.

After his accident Hannah and Bright decide to be friends again but do not rekindle their relationship. She passes up a full scholarship to Notre Dame to attend Colorado A&M and to stay in Everwood. The fate of Hannah and Bright's romantic relationship was left open.

Ephram meets Stephanie while hanging ads for a new roommate. She is feisty and fun without drama; Ephram likes how refreshingly easy she is to be around. Delia invites her to her bat mitzvah, and while there a slightly tipsy Amy realizes she is still in love with Ephram. She struggles with this realization until she thinks of the exact best way to tell Ephram how she feels. Recreating a moment they shared during a festival soon after he first moved there, she enlists Rose's help in ordering a Ferris wheel, stationing it outside his apartment. With this as her backdrop, she confesses that all their problems are her fault and asks him to give her another chance at a relationship, without the drama. Ephram, having loved Amy since the day he met her, easily agrees to be with her again, and the season and series end with Ephram and Amy embarking on a mature, adult relationship.

Series finale
Everwood's series finale, which aired on Monday, June 5, 2006, was seen by 4.07 million viewers.

The final episode, "Foreverwood", was written as both a season and a series finale. Because of the impending WB/UPN merger into the CW Television Network, the future of the series was uncertain, and the producers wrote two endings. Originally, the producers had scripted a montage for the "series-finale cut" that went forty years into the future to show a majority of the gang at Andy's funeral—showing the series coming full circle; this was never filmed due to budgetary reasons as well as the producers' hopes that they would receive a fifth season.

Everwood was canceled in favor of a new show, Runaway, which Dawn Ostroff then canceled after only three episodes had been shown, and for a new season of 7th Heaven, which had just had its series finale. The finale of 7th Heaven had 7 million viewers. Everwood had an average of 4 million viewers (which, if it was sustained, would have put it in the top 5 CW ratings for the following year).

Cast and characters by seasons

Home media
Warner Home Video has released all four seasons of Everwood on DVD in Region 1. While the entire series was shot in 16:9 widescreen, the first season DVD is presented in a cropped 4:3 aspect ratio. The final three season releases retain the original 16:9 aspect ratio; they also feature extensive music substitutions. In Region 2, Warner Home Video has also released all four seasons on DVD in Germany and in the Netherlands, and the first two seasons in Hungary. In Region 4, Warner Home Video has released the first season on DVD in Australia.

Reception

Critical response

Robert Bianco for USA Today was not enthusiastic about the show's premiere and gave it a two-star rating out of four. He found that Everwoods main problem was that it "never knows when the corn syrup is thick enough" due to its clichés. On the more positive side, he wrote, "Clearly, WB's goal here is to find an acceptable time-period companion for 7th Heaven, and it's entirely possible the network has. The scenery is pretty, Smith has the earmarks of a star in the making, and Williams actually is quite appealing—when the script isn't forcing him to behave as if he were insane." TV Guide was critical of the pilot episode and accused it of being a "bit excessive and sentimental" and self-consciously quirky, but that "it's beautifully acted, crisply written and has first-rate production values."

Advocacy group the Parents Television Council ranked Everwood as the group's No. 1 "worst network TV show for family viewing" on their list of the 2003–04 season. The PTC criticized "the careless and irresponsible treatment of sexual issues—especially when the teenaged characters are involved" and stated "Everwoods reckless messages about sex without consequences are expressly targeted to impressionable teens." Entertainment Weekly reviewed positively the show's third season in 2005 giving it an "A−" and commented, "Everwoods soap tropes—unexpected pregnancy, adultery—handles these stories artfully."

In 2003, TV Guide named Everwood one of "The Best Shows You May Not Be Watching".

Ratings
Seasonal rankings (based on average total viewers per episode) of Everwood on The WB.

Accolades
Everwood received two Emmy nominations: Outstanding Main Title Theme Music (2003) written by Blake Neely, and Outstanding Guest Actor in a Drama Series (2004) for James Earl Jones's turn as Will Cleveland.

Treat Williams has also received two Screen Actors Guild award nominations in 2003 and 2004 for his role as Dr. Andy Brown.

Soundtrack

 "Lonely People" – Jars of Clay (popularized by America)
 "Trouble" – Kristin Hersh (popularized by Cat Stevens)
 "These Days" – Griffin House (popularized by Nico and Jackson Browne)
 "The Only Living Boy in New York" – David Mead (popularized by Simon and Garfunkel)
 "Summer Breeze" – Jason Mraz (popularized by Seals and Crofts)
 "Father and Son" – Leigh Nash (popularized by Cat Stevens)
 "The Harder They Come" – Guster (popularized by Jimmy Cliff)
 "Don't Be Shy" – Travis (popularized by Cat Stevens)
 "Operator (That's Not the Way It Feels)" – Toby Lightman (popularized by Jim Croce)
 "The First Time Ever I Saw Your Face" – Stereophonics (popularized by Roberta Flack)
 "Cathedrals" – Jump Little Children
 "Main Title Theme for Everwood" – Blake Neely
 "A Love Song" – Treat Williams (bonus track; popularized by Anne Murray)

References

External links

 
 
 
 
 Four years of Everwood promotional material at Mr. Video

2000s American teen drama television series
2002 American television series debuts
2006 American television series endings
English-language television shows
Serial drama television series
Television series by Warner Bros. Television Studios
Television series created by Greg Berlanti
Television shows set in Colorado
The WB original programming
2000s American medical television series
Films shot in Salt Lake City
Television shows filmed in Utah